Richard Potter may refer to:

Richard Potter (businessman) (1817–1892), British businessman, chairman of the Great Western Railway company
Richard Potter (magician) (1783–1835), American magician
Richard Potter (British politician) (1778–1842), radical British Whig politician
Richard Potter (Canadian politician) (1915–2009), Ontario MPP
Rick Potter (born 1938), Canadian football player
Dick Potter, tennis player, see Barry MacKay

See also
Richard Pottier (1906–1994), film director